The École nationale supérieure d'architecture de Paris-La Villette is a public tertiary school located in Paris, France. It is placed under the supervision of the ministry for the Culture and the Communication (Direction of Architecture and the Inheritance). It is one of the twenty public schools which exempt a higher education of architecture in France.

The Georgia Institute of Technology College of Architecture (in the United States) maintains a small permanent presence at the school.

People

Nicolas Godin from the French electro band Air was architecture student of the École nationale supérieure d'architecture de Paris la Villette.

External links
Official website

Architecture
Paris-La Villette
Buildings and structures in the 19th arrondissement of Paris
Georgia Tech